Neil Grove (born 18 January 1971) is a South African-English Heavyweight professional mixed martial artist. A professional competitor since 2006, Grove has competed for the UFC, Bellator Cage Rage, UCMMA, and the SFL.

Background
Originally from South Africa, Grove began competing in rugby at a young age. Having attended eight different schools growing up, Grove was frequently bullied being the "new kid," and often got into fights as a result. In 1996, Grove moved to London, England, where he worked as a personal trainer, sports therapist, and also worked as a bouncer at an Irish nightclub in South London. In 2000, after Grove and a fellow bouncer were involved in a massive brawl at the nightclub, the two men were forced to take Goju-ryu classes at Daigaku Karate Kai as a way of learning control and self-restraint. Grove soon developed a love for the martial art, which, as a combat-style karate, involves throws and submission wrestling. A year after receiving his black belt in 2005, Grove transitioned into Sambo, Brazilian jiu-jitsu and mixed martial arts.

Mixed martial arts career

Early career
Grove made his professional debut at UKMMAC 17: Iron Circle on 16 November 2006, beating Anthony Okorie by TKO. He next fought at UKMMAC 18: Fists of Fury against Denniston Sutherland, who was 30 kg lighter than Grove at the time. Grove won by TKO in the first round.

Cage Rage
On 14 July 2007, Grove made his Cage Rage debut at Cage Rage 22: Hard as Hell, stepping in on two days notice to fight PRIDE veteran James Thompson. Grove knocked out the heavily favored Thompson in just 10 seconds of the first round. Grove followed up with two more stoppages in Cage Rage before facing former Cage Rage heavyweight champion Rob Broughton. Grove lost the bout by majority decision.

Grove fought in a rematch against Robert Berry at Cage Rage 27: Step Up on 12 July 2008. He won via TKO in the second round. After the fight, Grove called out both Mostapha Al-turk and Kimbo Slice. Grove and Al-turk were scheduled for a heavyweight title fight before Cage Rage closed down.

Ultimate Challenge MMA

After Cage Rage fell, Grove went on to Dave O'Donnell's new promotion: Ultimate Challenge MMA. On their very first event, Grove defeated James McSweeney via TKO to win the inaugural Ultimate Challenge Heavyweight title.

Ultimate Fighting Championship
On 16 December 2008, Grove announced that he was signing a four-fight deal with the Ultimate Fighting Championship. Grove expressed interest in fighting fellow European standout Mostapha al-Turk, who has also signed with the UFC.

He lost his long-awaited UFC debut UFC 95 in London, England, to Mike Ciesnolevicz via Heel hook submission early in the first round. Grove was released from his UFC contract in May.

Return to Ultimate Challenge MMA
After being released from the UFC, he returned to UCMMA as their Heavyweight Champion. Grove defeated Martin Thompson to retain his title.

He then fought to a draw with Stav Economou at Ultimate Challenge MMA: Never Back Down.

Bellator
Grove made his Bellator and U.S. debut against Eddie Sanchez, winning via TKO (Punches) at 1:32 of round 1.

He next faced Alexey Oleynik at Bellator 29 and won via TKO at 0:45 in the first round. This win earned Grove a spot in the finals of the Bellator Heavyweight Tournament, where he faced undefeated wrestler Cole Konrad. Grove lost the fight via submission in the first round.

Grove was scheduled to make his return to the promotion at Bellator 43 where he would face The Ultimate Fighter 10 alumnus Zak Jensen. However, Grove pulled out of the bout due to an injury. Grove instead fought Jensen at Bellator 47. He won the fight via TKO in the first round.

Grove entered the Bellator Season Five Heavyweight Tournament. He faced Mike Hayes at Bellator 52 and lost the back-and-forth bout via split decision.

Grove faced Thiago Santos at Bellator 56 in the semi-finals after Blagoi Ivanov pulled out of the bout due to an injury. He lost the fight via submission in the first round.

Super Fight League
Grove faced Todd Duffee in the main event at SFL 2. He lost via TKO at 34 seconds in the first round.

Third run in UCMMA
Grove was scheduled to return to UCMMA at UCMMA 31 to face Darren Towler for the UCMMA heavyweight title, but Towler had to retire before the match due to a serious shoulder injury, being replaced by Tomasz Czerwinski making the match for the interim heavyweight title.

Grove snapped his three fight losing streak, knocking out Czerwinski in the first round.

Bellator return
After being away from the sport for two and a half years, Grove is scheduled to return in July 2016.  He faced James Mulheron at Bellator 158 on 16 July 2016. Grove lost the fight by unanimous decision.

Grove was scheduled to face Łukasz Parobiec on 19 May 2017 at Bellator 170. However, the fight was cancelled for undisclosed reasons.

Championships and accomplishments
Ultimate Challenge MMA
Ultimate Challenge MMA Heavyweight Championship (One time)
Ultimate Challenge MMA Interim Heavyweight Championship (Current)
Bellator Fighting Championship
Bellator Season Three Heavyweight Tournament Runner up

Mixed martial arts record

|-
| Loss
| align=center| 12–8–1
| James Mulheron
| Decision (unanimous)
| Bellator 158
| 
| align=center| 3
| align=center| 5:00
| London, England
|
|-
| Loss
| align=center| 12–7–1
| Shamil Abdurakhimov
| Decision (unanimous)
| Tech-Krep FC: Southern Front 2 
| 
| align=center| 3
| align=center| 5:00
| Krasnodar, Russia
| 
|-
| Win
| align=center| 12–6–1
| Tomasz Czerwinski
| KO (punches)
| UCMMA 31
| 
| align=center| 1
| align=center| 2:59
| London, England, United Kingdom
| Won the Interim UCMMA Heavyweight Championship.
|-
| Loss
| align=center| 11–6–1
| Todd Duffee
| TKO (punches)
| SFL 2
| 
| align=center| 1
| align=center| 0:34
| Chandigarh, India
| 
|-
| Loss
| align=center| 11–5–1
| Thiago dos Santos
| Submission (rear-naked choke)
| Bellator 56
| 
| align=center| 1
| align=center| 0:38
| Kansas City, Kansas, United States
| Bellator Season Five Heavyweight Tournament Semifinal; Replaced an injured Blagoi Ivanov.
|-
| Loss
| align=center| 11–4–1
| Mike Hayes
| Decision (split)
| Bellator 52
| 
| align=center| 3
| align=center| 5:00
| Lake Charles, Louisiana, United States
| Bellator Season Five Heavyweight Tournament Quarterfinal.
|-
| Win
| align=center| 11–3–1
| Zak Jensen
| TKO (punches)
| Bellator 47
| 
| align=center| 1
| align=center| 2:00
| Rama, Ontario, Canada
| 
|-
| Loss
| align=center| 10–3–1
| Cole Konrad
| Submission (americana)
| Bellator 32
| 
| align=center| 1
| align=center| 4:45
| Kansas City, Missouri, United States
| Bellator Season Three Heavyweight Tournament Final.
|-
| Win
| align=center| 10–2–1
| Alexey Oleynik
| TKO (punches)
| Bellator 29
| 
| align=center| 1
| align=center| 0:45
| Milwaukee, Wisconsin, United States
| Bellator Season Three Heavyweight Tournament Semifinal.
|-
| Win
| align=center| 9–2–1
| Eddie Sanchez
| TKO (referee stoppage)
| Bellator 24
| 
| align=center| 1
| align=center| 1:32
| Hollywood, Florida, United States
| Bellator Season Three Heavyweight Tournament Quarterfinal.
|-
| Draw
| align=center| 8–2–1
| Stav Economou
| Draw
| UCMMA 12: Never Back Down
| 
| align=center| 3
| align=center| 5:00
| London, England
| For the UCMMA Heavyweight Championship.
|-
| Win
| align=center| 8–2
| Martin Thompson
| TKO (punches)
| UCMMA 8: Dynamite
| 
| align=center| 1
| align=center| 0:53
| London, England
| Retained the UCMMA Heavyweight Championship

|-
| Loss
| align=center| 7–2
| Mike Ciesnolevicz
| Submission (inverted heel hook)
| UFC 95
| 
| align=center| 1
| align=center| 1:03
| London, England
| 
|-
| Win
| align=center| 7–1
| James McSweeney
| KO (punches)
| UCMMA 1: Bad Breed
| 
| align=center| 2
| align=center| 1:38
| London, England
| Won UCMMA Heavyweight Championship.
|-
| Win
| align=center| 6–1
| Robert Berry
| TKO (punches)
| Cage Rage 27
| 
| align=center| 2
| align=center| 1:29
| London, England
| 
|-
| Loss
| align=center| 5–1
| Rob Broughton
| Decision (majority)
| Cage Rage 25
| 
| align=center| 3
| align=center| 5:00
| London, England
| 
|-
| Win
| align=center| 5–0
| Robert Berry
| TKO (corner stoppage)
| Cage Rage 24
| 
| align=center| 1
| align=center| 5:00
| London, England
| 
|-
| Win
| align=center| 4–0
| Domagoj Ostojic
| TKO (punches)
| Cage Rage 23
| 
| align=center| 1
| align=center| 0:34
| London, England
| 
|-
| Win
| align=center| 3–0
| James Thompson
| KO (punch)
| Cage Rage 22
| 
| align=center| 1
| align=center| 0:10
| London, England
| 
|-
| Win
| align=center| 2–0
| Denniston Sutherland       
| TKO (punches)
| UKMMAC 18: Fists of Fury
| 
| align=center| 1
| align=center| 3:05
| Purfleet, England
| 
|-
| Win
| align=center| 1–0
| Anthony Okorie
| TKO (punches)
| UKMMAC 17: Iron Circle
| 
| align=center| 1
| align=center| 0:54
| England
|

See also
 List of current mixed martial arts champions
 List of male mixed martial artists

References

External links
 
 

1971 births
Living people
White South African people
English male mixed martial artists
South African male mixed martial artists
Heavyweight mixed martial artists
Mixed martial artists utilizing Muay Thai
Mixed martial artists utilizing sambo
Mixed martial artists utilizing Gōjū-ryū
Mixed martial artists utilizing Brazilian jiu-jitsu
English sportspeople of South African descent
English male karateka
South African male karateka
English Muay Thai practitioners
South African Muay Thai practitioners
English practitioners of Brazilian jiu-jitsu
South African practitioners of Brazilian jiu-jitsu
English sambo practitioners
South African sambo practitioners
Ultimate Fighting Championship male fighters